Ariake Dam  is a gravity dam located in Hokkaido Prefecture in Japan. The dam is used for flood control. The catchment area of the dam is 19.5 km2. The dam impounds about 33  ha of land when full and can store 2440 thousand cubic meters of water. The construction of the dam was started on 1967 and completed in 1971.

References

Dams in Hokkaido